MTV Unplugged (1996) is the twenty-third album and sixth live album (released, third recorded) by Mexican rock and blues band El Tri. Recorded 10 years earlier the album was released as one more compilation.

Track listing 
All tracks by Alex Lora

 "Difícil" (Difficult) – 3:09 (21 Años Después, Alex Lora y El Tri, 1989)
 "Oye Cantinero" (Hey, Bartender) – 4:40 (Three Souls in My Mind III, 1972)
 "Mente Rockera" (Rocking Mind) – 4:44 (La Devaluación, 1975)
 "Las Piedras Rodantes" (The Rolling Stones) – 3:50 (Una Rola Para los Minusvalidos, 1994)
 "Los Minusválidos" (The Handicapped) – 3:49 (Una Rola Para los Minusvalidos, 1994)
 "Triste Canción" (Sad Song) – 7:42 (Simplemente, 1984)
 "Niño Sin Amor" (The Child Without Love) – 5:37 (El Niño Sin Amor, 1986)
 "Pobres de los Niños" (Poor Kids) – 3:24 (Bellas de Noche, 1979)
 "Chavo de Onda" (Cool Kid) – 6:30 (Chavo de Onda, 1973)
 "Pobre Soñador" (Poor Dreamer) – 4:48 (25 Años, 1993)
 "Perro Negro" (Black And Stray Dog) – 4:07 (Chavo de Onda, 1973)
 "A.D.O." – 7:26 (Es lo Mejor, 1974)
Album and year of original release inside parenthesis

Personnel 

 Alex Lora – guitar, bass, vocals, producer, mixing
 Rafael Salgado – harmonic
 Eduardo Chico – guitar
 Oscar Zarate – guitar
 Chela Lora – backing vocals
 Pedro Martinez – drums
 Ruben Soriano – bass

Guest musicians 

 Zbigniew Paleta – violin
 Eduardo Toral – keyboards

Technical personnel 

 Gabriel Baptiste – programming
 Craig Brock – editing, mastering, mixing
 Peter Yianilos, Raul Gutierrez, Jason Griffith, Bob Broun – audio supervisor
 Bob Small, Jimmy Burns – concept
 Eileen Roberts, Bruno Del Granado, Guido Caroni – artist coordination
 Tim Fox, Ken Carpenter – technical director
 Joaquin Perez Fernandez, Marco Cataño – A&R
 Emilce Elgarresta, Barbara Corcoran – executive producer
 Lynn Fainchtein – art direction
 David Rojas, Johnny Medina, Joe Hernandez, Dalex Gnochi – production assistant
 Miriam Luciow – assistant producer
 Alejandro Pels – producer
 Alfonso Peña – product manager
 Joe Perota – director
 Fernando Roldán – mastering
 Ricardo Trabulsi – photography
 Raul Videgaray – assistant
 Antoinette Zel – legal advisor

References

External links 
www.eltri.com.mx
MTV Unplugged at MusicBrainz
[ MTV Unplugged] at Allmusic

El Tri live albums
1996 live albums
Warner Music Group live albums
Spanish-language live albums
Mtv Unplugged (Tri, El Album)